College Woodwork is a century-old furniture manufacturer located in Oshawa, Ontario, Canada and is a subsidiary of Kingsway College. College Woodwork was originally a woodworking class for students attending Lornedale Academy and today provides employment for students of Kingsway College.

History Of College

College Woodwork began in the early 1900s as a woodworking class for students attending Lornedale Academy. For both philosophical and economic reasons, work was viewed as an essential component of education. By 1920, the woodworking class had grown into a business producing small household items such as trellises, playpens, potty chairs, ladders and ironing boards. Furniture was a natural extension of the product line, and by the early 1960s, production focused on simple furniture.

Closed in 2016.

Key People
Sheldon Smith, President
George Ryan, Vice President
Anna Wojtczak, Human Resources Manager

References

External links

Companies based in Oshawa
Furniture companies of Canada